EX2 may refer to:

(20003) 1991 EX2, a minor planet
The Expendables 2, a 2012 film
Facel Vega Excellence EX2, a luxury car
The King of Fighters EX2: Howling Blood, a 2003 video game
Street Fighter EX2, a 1998 video game
EX2, a postcode district in the EX postcode area 
EX2 - The Land Beyond the Magic Mirror, a 1983 Advanced Dungeons and Dragons fantasy adventure module